The Edinburgh Comedy Awards, formerly known as the Perrier Comedy Awards, the if.comedy awards and briefly as the if.comeddies, are a group of prizes awarded annually since 1981 to comedy shows at the Edinburgh Festival Fringe.

In 2019 Dave began sponsoring the awards and they are now known as Dave's Edinburgh Comedy Awards.

Currently three awards are given – Best Comedy Show, Best Newcomer and the Panel Prize.

Main prize

Best Newcomer Award

Panel Prize

See also
 Edinburgh Comedy Awards
 Edinburgh Festival Fringe

References

External links
 Edinburgh Comedy Awards (Official Website)
 TV clip of sketch from the Cambridge Footlights 1981 show

Humor-related lists
Scottish comedy
Comedy award
Edinburgh comedy
Edinburgh Festival Fringe awards